Yphthimoides is a genus of satyrid butterflies found in the Neotropical realm.

Species
Listed alphabetically:
Yphthimoides acmenis (Hübner, 1823)
Yphthimoides affinis (Butler, 1867)
Yphthimoides angularis (Butler, 1867)
Yphthimoides argyrospila (Butler, 1867)
Yphthimoides austera (Butler, 1867)
Yphthimoides borasta (Schaus, 1902)
Yphthimoides celmis (Godart, [1824])
Yphthimoides cipoensis Freitas, 2004
Yphthimoides eriphule (Butler, 1867)
Yphthimoides leguialimai (Dyar, 1913)
Yphthimoides maepius (Godart, [1824])
Yphthimoides manasses (C. & R. Felder)
Yphthimoides mimula (Hayward, 1954)
Yphthimoides mythra (Weymer, 1911)
Yphthimoides neomaenas (Hayward, 1967)
Yphthimoides ochracea (Butler, 1867)
Yphthimoides pacta (Weymer, 1911)
Yphthimoides patricia (Hayward, 1957)
Yphthimoides punctata (Weymer, 1911)
Yphthimoides renata (Stoll, [1780])
Yphthimoides straminea (Butler, 1867)
Yphthimoides viviana (Romieux, 1927)
Yphthimoides yphthima (C. & R. Felder, [1867])

References

Euptychiina
Nymphalidae of South America
Butterfly genera
Taxa named by Walter Forster (entomologist)